Kathrin Menzinger (born 24 September 1988 in Vienna) is an Austrian dancer.

Biography
She started to dance at the age of 3, first with ballet, but soon changed to Ballroom and Latin dancing.
Together with her brother, Patrick Menzinger, she won numerous Junior- and Youth national Dancesport Championships 
in Austria during the years 1999 - 2004.

In 2004, she changed her partner and teamed up with the Canadian dancer Vadim Garbuzov, with whom she reached
the final of the WDSF World Youth Ten Dance Championship 2005 in Antwerp (Belgium). 
2006 they won the Austrian National Ten Dance Championship, and in the same year they managed to reach the Semifinal of the 
World Ten Dance Championship in Moscow.

Due to an injury she had to leave competitive dancing for two years, but came back in 2009, and placed 4th in the European Cup Ten Dance 2010 in Minsk, Belarus.

In 2011 she started her TV-career by starring in the Austrian version of the BBC-format Strictly come dancing, called
"Dancing Stars",  as a professional dancer, teaming up with the Austrian Journalist and Comedian Dieter Chmelar.

In July 2011 she and her partner Vadim Garbuzov also appeared in the ORF-production " Night of the Stars ",
which brought them an entry in the Internet Movie Database IMDb.

2012 she took part in the 7th season of "Dancing Stars" in Austria again, this time together with the young Austrian actor David Heissig. In the 4th round they were eliminated.
2013 she teamed up with the Austrian musical Star Lukas Perman, they reached the final show and finished third.
2014 her partner in "Dancing Stars" was the Austrian former ski jumper Hubert Neuper, they reached again the final show, finishing third.

2014 she and her partner Vadim Garbuzov took part in the "New Years Concert" of the Viennese Philharmonic Orchestra, performing the famous Blue Danube Waltz live at the Wiener Musikverein to their own choreography.

In 2012 they started in WDSF Showdance competitions, and managed to reach the finals of the 2012 and 2013 World Championships in Beijing, and also the finals of the World Dance Sport Games 2013 in Kaoshiung in Taiwan.

2014 they turned Professional, and won the European Championship Showdance Latin, and placed second in the world championships
Showdance Latin and Standard and the European Championships Showdance Standard.

2015 she took part in the RTL production "Let's Dance" together with the former soccer player Hans Sarpei and won the competition.

Just one day after the final show of Let's Dance she managed to win together with her partner Vadim Garbuzov the World Championship Show Dance Latin
of the Prodessional Division of the WDSF.

In November 2015 she also won the World Championship ShowDance Standard, again with her partner Vadim, thus being the first couple ever to hold both titles in Showdance Latin and Standard.

Achievements
 World Youth Ten Dance Championship Finalist 2005
 Austrian Ten Dance Champion 2006
 World Ten Dance Championship Semifinalist 2006
 European Cup Ten Dance Finalist 2010
 6-times Finalist World Championships ShowDance Latin and Standard 2012 - 2013
 Vice-World Champion Showdance Latin and Standard 2014
 European Champion Showdance Latin 2014
 World Champion Showdance Latin 2015
 World Champion Showdance Standard 2015

References

External links
www.doubledance.at
dancingstars.orf.at
www.dancesportinfo.net

1988 births
Living people
Dancers from Vienna
Austrian female dancers